Lake Ellesmere / Te Waihora is a broad, shallow coastal lake or waituna, in the Canterbury region of the South Island of New Zealand. It is directly to the west of Banks Peninsula, separated from the Pacific Ocean by the long, narrow, sandy Kaitorete Spit, or more correctly Kaitorete Barrier. It lies partially in extreme southeastern Selwyn District and partially in the southwestern extension of the former Banks Peninsula District, which now (since 2006) is a ward in the city of Christchurch. The lake holds high historical and cultural significance to the indigenous Māori population and the traditional Māori name Te Waihora, means spreading waters. It has officially had a dual English/Māori name since at least 1938.

Geography and hydrology 
Currently Lake Ellesmere / Te Waihora is a brackish bar-type waterbody, commonly called a lake or lagoon.

Waituna and river mouth lagoons, or hapua, form an interlinked chain of habitats or corridor, which run the length of the east coast of the South Island, from Wairau Lagoon and Lake Grassmere in Marlborough, through Lake Ellesmere / Te Waihora and Coopers Lagoon / Muriwai in Central Canterbury, Washdyke and Wainono Lagoons in South Canterbury, to Waituna Lagoon in Southland.

Catchment 
Nearly all of the water entering Lake Ellesmere / Te Waihora is derived from the groundwater system that underlies the gravel-dominated strata of the Central Canterbury Plains. The groundwater system is fed from two sources of recharge: rainfall incident on the plains and subterranean seepage from the Rakaia and Waimakariri Rivers. The exception to this is periods of persistent rainfall, usually during winter when discharge into Lake Ellesmere / Te Waihora is supplemented by surface flow derived from the foothills from the Rakaia Gorge to Darfield. This illustrates why Lake Ellesmere / Te Waihora has undergone significant ecological transformation in recent years as land use practices in the catchment area have changed. Little detail is known about water level regimes, internal circulation or sedimentation regimes of such lagoons, however it is known that they are significantly vulnerable to human use of the surrounding land and contributing catchments through changes to their hydrological regimes, as well as their sediment and chemical input loads.

Nature 
Southern elephant seals have been observed here, spending short periods in the lake. Basking sharks have occasionally entered the lake.

History 
Although Lake Ellesmere / Te Waihora is less than 5000 years old it has undergone many dramatic changes over that short period of time. The lake is a dynamic feature, it has been up to twice its present depth and area in the past, and it has progressed through various stages as it has developed into the brackish bar-type lagoon that we see today. In chronological order these stages began with the lake as part of Canterbury plains, which were then flooded, forming a bay, then an estuary and finally a lake / lagoon / waituna.

The original formation of Lake Ellesmere / Te Waihora was primarily a function of formation of Kaitorete Barrier. Kaitorete Barrier is often incorrectly referred to as a spit. However, by definition this is incorrect as a spit is widest at the updrift end and tapers to a narrow tip at the downdrift end, but the Kaitorete Barrier is narrower at the southern (updrift) end and widest at the northern (downdrift) end. Kaitorete is also attached to the land at both ends (although somewhat tenuously in south) and therefore technically classed as a Barrier beach.

The formation of Kaitorete Barrier began at the end of the Last Glacial Maximum 20,000 years ago valley glaciers advanced in Canterbury and subsequent glacial outwash rivers delivered vast quantities of sand, gravel and silt to the coast. Sea level in Canterbury was 130 meters lower than the present day due to glaciation and the coast was as far as 50 km east of its present-day position, meaning the Canterbury plains were double their present width. Subsequent rapid sea level rise then drowned what is now the continental shelf, causing rapid westward migration of the coast. 10,000 years ago the Canterbury coast was approaching the area presently occupied by Lake Ellesmere / Te Waihora. The coast consisted then, as it does now of the unconsolidated sands and gravels of the fans of major rivers in the area such as the Rakaia and Waimakariri. The Canterbury Bight was exposed to powerful southerly waves. The combination of weakly resistant unconsolidated sands and gravels and high energy wave action caused rapid coastal erosion and strong net northward transport of the resulting load of sands and gravels fed to the shore.

This completes the sequence of events leading up to the formation of Lake Ellesmere / Te Waihora; with rapid sea-level rise drowning the seaward edge of plains, rapid erosion of coast to south changing its position and providing, in addition to direct river-borne sediments, a massive supply of sea borne sediments and strong net northwards longshore drift by waves, moving the sediments towards Banks Peninsula and providing the materials to construct Kaitorete Barrier, that now encloses the lake.

If left to develop naturally Lake Ellesmere / Te Waihora will once again become a saltwater estuary over the next few centuries.

Cultural significance
Lake Ellesmere / Te Waihora has been a revered mahinga kai (site of traditional significance for food and other natural resources) for Māori since ancient times and remains central to the lives of many Māori who now live in the area. Under the Ngāi Tahu Claims Settlement 1998, ownership of the lake bed of Lake Ellesmere / Te Waihora was returned to Te Rūnanga O Ngāi Tahu, who are now able to reassert their rangatiratanga (ownership) over this significant site through direct control of its management.

The traditional name for the lake was Te Kete Ika o Rākaihautū meaning "the fish basket of Rākaihautū". The food sources of Lake Ellesmere / Te Waihora were once abundant and included tuna (eels), pātiki (flounder) and aua (mullet). Lake Ellesmere / Te Waihora was a famed mahinga manu wai māori (place for taking waterfowl). However, today the richness of Lake Ellesmere / Te Waihora as a mahinga kai has been largely lost to farmland. While it remains a mahinga kai, its yields have been significantly reduced due to the periodic drainage of the lake in order to maintain reclaimed land and pasture. In the pre-Pākehā past however, the control of the lake’s level was retained at an optimum water level for the birdlife that lived there and provided kai (food) for many people. The lake was only drained when its level exceeded the normal maximum. Kōrari (flax stalks) were dragged across the sand to make the initial opening of the water to the sea. Such carefully monitored drainage of the lake took place for several hundred years, consistently maintaining Lake Ellesmere / Te Waihora's abundant supply of kai.

In 2007 an assessment of the cultural health of Lake Ellesmere / Te Waihora was undertaken as a combined effort by Ngai Tahu and the National Institute of Water and Atmospheric Research (NIWA). Preliminary findings showed that the lake, and in particular the lake edge still holds significant mahinga kai values, despite obvious water quality, modification, pressure and native vegetation issues.

As a result of the study, and in particular the interviews with Tāngata whenua, a number of unique themes and health indicators for Lake Ellesmere / Te Waihora were identified. Drivers of change were identified as: catchment land use modification and intensification; drainage, management and reclamation of wetlands; decline in quality; and access to mahinga kai and a decline in inflow and lake water quality and quantity. Major changes over time were identified as: the loss of mahinga kai habitat; loss of matauranga Ngai Tahu (the knowledge of the local iwi); domination of the fishery by commercial operators; declining access and use of the lake and mahinga kai; and degradation of mauri (life force) of the lake and mana. For the indigenous population desirable outcomes for the future include regeneration and restoration of native habitat; higher and fluctuating lake levels; an increase in the native bird population; reduced sedimentation and erosion; integrated management action; more Ngai Tahu and community use; mahinga kai activity rejuvenated; and Te Kete Ika o Rakaihautu/The Fish Basket of Rakaihautu restored.

Recreation 

As well as holding high cultural significance to the indigenous population Lake Ellesmere / Te Waihora is also rated as a nationally significant site for recreation. The lake is currently used for a wide range of water and land based activities. It has been identified as nationally significant for waterfowl hunting, and regionally significant for fishing and cycling on the rail trail.

A wide range of both water and land based activities are currently undertaken in  the area including fishing, waterfowl hunting, bird-watching, picnicking, camping, cycling, trail biking, scenic driving  and water sports such as kayaking and water-skiing. Many of these activities are reliant on a healthy natural ecosystem, especially fish and wildlife habitat, and a decrease in the number of people participating in trout fishing and other activities has been recorded since 1996.

State of the lake and future management 
In a 2010 report on lake water quality Lake Ellesmere / Te Waihora was deemed the second most polluted lake in New Zealand in terms of nutrient content and algal growth. Algal blooms are a regular summer occurrence and toxic algae bloomed in the lake in 2009. Furthermore, most tributaries to the lake exceed the contact recreation guidelines for faecal coliforms and levels of faecal coliforms in Boggy Creek and Doyleston Drain frequently exceed the stock-drinking water guideline value.

Results for E. coli levels are also poor with 42% of sites associated with the lake failing national recreational guide standards for water quality. No sites achieved the shellfish/food gathering standard or were fit for drinking. However, there is some debate over the definition of the trophic status of Lake Ellesmere / Te Waihora. Although the lake has high nutrient and phytoplankton values that place it in the category of hypertrophic (extremely enriched) the lake does not exhibit many of the characteristics of such a classification. For example, it does not regularly undergo severe oxygen depletion, nor does it produce unsightly toxic algal blooms or fish kills, unlike other lakes in the area with the same trophic status. Furthermore, it supports abundant fish and bird communities.

Recently it has been recognised that the combination of abstraction and climate was causing adverse effects on groundwater levels that in turn adversely affected the spring fed stream discharge into Lake Ellesmere / Te Waihora. The dependency of lake on the ground water system in its catchment cannot be reduced, but it is to be hoped that by managing groundwater abstractions during times when the inputs to the aquifer system are low the output system to the lake will be maintained at a level that ensures the protection of Lake Ellesmere / Te Waihora. Being a low land lake Lake Ellesmere / Te Waihora not only receives inputs within the immediate vicinity of the lake but also from the wider catchment across the plains to the foothills. The quality of lake tributaries reflects the intensive land use surrounding them, with elevated nutrients and bacteria found in many sites. This has implications for the scale of management issues. The dependency of Lake Ellesmere / Te Waihora on groundwater sourced input has resulted in local authority Environment Canterbury implementing a restorative programme for lowland streams. Riparian protection around the lake margin and tributaries will greatly help reduce some contaminant inputs such as sediment and phosphorus, but catchment wide nutrient and water allocation management will be needed to reduce nitrates and improve freshwater inflows to the lake.

See also

 Lakes of New Zealand

References

Further reading
 Originally from An Encyclopaedia of New Zealand, edited by A. H. McLintock, published in 1966.

External links
 Avenues Magazine – Ellesmere Swansong: the end of a lake?
 Public Address – The End of Lake Ellesmere
Waihora Ellesmere Trust – set up to educate people about Lake Ellesmere
Map of Banks Peninsula ward, Christchurch

Lagoons of New Zealand
Lakes of Canterbury, New Zealand
Wetlands of Canterbury, New Zealand